Marrickville, an electoral district of the Legislative Assembly in the Australian state of New South Wales, has had two incarnations, the first from 1894 to 1920, the second from 1927 to 2015.


Election results

Elections in the 2010s

2011

Elections in the 2000s

2007

2005 by-election

2003

Elections in the 1990s

1999

1995

1991

Elections in the 1980s

1988

1984

1983 by-election

1981

Elections in the 1970s

1978

1976

1973

1971

Elections in the 1960s

1968

1965

1962

Elections in the 1950s

1959

1956

1953

1950

Elections in the 1940s

1947

1944

1941

Elections in the 1930s

1938

1935

1932

1930

Elections in the 1920s

1927

1920 - 1927
District abolished

Elections in the 1910s

1917

1913

1910

Elections in the 1900s

1907

1904

1901

Elections in the 1890s

1898

1895

1894

References

New South Wales state electoral results by district